Claes Rålamb (8 May 1622 – 14 March 1698) was a Swedish statesman. In 1660 he was appointed Governor of Uppland County and in 1664 he served in the Privy Council. Between 1673 and 1678, he served as the Governor of Stockholm.

Claes Rålamb led a Swedish embassy to the Ottoman Empire's Sublime Porte.

The Rålamb Album of Costumes

The Rålamb Album of Costumes contains 121 paintings depicting costumes of the Ottoman court and men and women of various ranks in Ottoman society. Each figure is drawn in Indian ink with gouache and some gilding on separate sheets of paper sized 14.5 x 10 cm. . The sheets are trimmed and bound together in to one volume, all as right sides that alternate top to bottom. Most leaves have inscriptions on the front or back in Swedish, French, Italian, or Latin, indicating what they represent, and each is numbered in ink on the upper right corner.

They were acquired in Constantinople in 1657-58 by Claes Rålamb who led a Swedish embassy to the Sublime Porte, and arrived in the Swedish Royal Library / Manuscript Department in 1886.

This volume is a variant of the so-called muraqqa-album type, which is rather common in libraries in Europe. They were probably manufactured for European visitors, as precursors of the 19th century 'pittoresque' photos and the present-day folklore postcards.

The miniatures have strong connections with the 'Rålamb Procession Paintings', a series of 20 paintings depicting the Sultan's procession to Adrianople, which are now displayed in the Nordiska Museet in Stockholm. Rålamb witnessed this procession and described it at length in his diary. The paintings were executed to his order, probably by a European artist. The miniatures may well have served as models for the artist.

See also 
 Rålambshovsparken

References

Further reading 
 Rålamb, C., Diarium under resa till Konstantinopel 1657–1658, utg. gm Christian Callmer. - Stockholm 1963. - (Historiska handlingar ; 37:3).

1622 births
1698 deaths
County governors of Sweden
Members of the Privy Council of Sweden
Swedish diplomats
Swedish nobility
17th-century Swedish politicians